The women's 800 metres event at the 1963 Pan American Games was held at the Pacaembu Stadium in São Paulo on 28 April. It was the first time that this event was held for women at the Games.

Results

References

Athletics at the 1963 Pan American Games
1963